NLRX1 or NLR family member X1, short for nucleotide-binding oligomerization domain, leucine rich repeat containing X1 is a protein that in humans is encoded by the NLRX1 gene.  It is also known as NOD-like receptor X1, NLR family, X1, NOD5, NOD9, and CLR11.3, and is a member of the NOD-like receptor family of pattern recognition receptors.

Function 

NLRX1 is an intracellular protein that plays a role in the immune system.  NLRX1 has been proposed to affect innate immunity to viruses by interfering with the mitochondrial antiviral signaling protein (MAVS)/retinoic-acid-inducible gene I (RIG-I) mitochondrial antiviral pathway., although this was recently questioned.

NLRX1 also plays a role in host immunity during bacterial infections, such as Chlamydia trachomatis and Helicobacter pylori, by regulating bacterial burden and inflammation in mononuclear phagocytes. Mechanisms underlying the modulation of NLRX1 are not well characterized, however computational modeling predictions suggest that levels of NLRX1 may be controlled by negative feedback circuits induced early after infection.

Structure 

NLRX1 has a unique protein structure composed of 3 protein domains: an N-terminal effector domain containing a mitochondrion localization signal; a central NACHT domain; a C-terminal leucine-rich repeat (LRR) domain.

References

Further reading 

 
 
 
 
 

LRR proteins
NOD-like receptors